The following is a list of legislation passed by the Legislative Council of Hong Kong. Some have been repealed and replaced with updated laws. In total there are 1181 ordinances in effect and an assortment of subsidiary legislation associated with them.

Legislative enactments of Hong Kong are called Ordinances.

References
 Chapter Number Index - Hong Kong e-Legislation
 Hong Kong Ordinances

Law of Hong Kong